Ranjhe is a village in the Punjab province of Pakistan. It is located at 33°6'0N 72°32'46E with an altitude of 410 metres (1348 feet).

References

Villages in Punjab, Pakistan